Robert Dunn (born 6 July 1960) is a Scottish-born Australian former soccer player. Dunn played as a defender in a career that spanned 15 years.

Playing career

Club career
Dunn played in the National Soccer League for Preston Makedonia, West Adelaide and Melbourne Croatia.

State career
Dunn represented the Western Australian state team once against Millwall in 1989.

International career
Dunn represented Australia 36 times including 25 full international matches.

Coaching career
Dunn was a playing coach at North Perth Croatia in 1993.

At the start of the 2007 A-League season he was employed on a part-time basis by Perth Glory to assist David Mitchell in coaching duties. Due to business commitments he was unable to pursue a full-time coaching career.

He was appointed coach of the Western Australian state team in 2008 and has coached the team in three matches.

Post football
He currently lives in Perth. He was an expert commentator on 990 Information Radio's coverage of Perth Glory A-League games. Dunn is a regularly interviewed through a variety of  media outlets for advice and updates on Australia and international games.

Dunn still plays in the Masters League Soccer in Western Australia competes in International Masters Tournaments and was the Senior Coach of Western Knights until 2013.

References

External links

1960 births
Living people
Footballers from Paisley, Renfrewshire
Australian soccer players
Australian expatriate soccer players
Australia international soccer players
Australia B international soccer players
Expatriate footballers in Malaysia
National Soccer League (Australia) players
Hong Kong First Division League players
Melbourne Knights FC players
Preston Lions FC players
Scottish expatriate sportspeople in Hong Kong
South China AA players
West Adelaide SC players
Selangor FA players
Footballers at the 1988 Summer Olympics
Olympic soccer players of Australia
Expatriate footballers in Hong Kong
Australian expatriate sportspeople in Hong Kong
Scottish emigrants to Australia
Association football defenders